The College of Piping may refer to:
The College of Piping in Glasgow, Scotland
The College of Piping and Celtic Performing Arts of Canada